A Quiet Dream is a 2016 South Korean drama film written and directed by Korean-Chinese filmmaker Zhang Lu and starring Han Ye-ri alongside several Korean directors playing her potential suitors, including Park Jung-bum, Yoon Jong-bin and Yang Ik-june. It made its world premiere as the opening film of the 21st Busan International Film Festival on October 6, 2016.

Synopsis
A story about a young woman Ye-ri (Han Ye-ri) who runs a bar and takes care of her unconscious paralyzed father, and three men (Yang Ik-june, Park Jung-bum, Yoon Jong-bin) who frequent the bar trying without much success to win her heart. This strange trio's interactions with Ye-ri offer funny moments and barbed quips galore, as the men compete feebly for the woman's attention.

Cast
 Han Ye-ri as Ye-ri
 Yang Ik-june as Ik-june, a gang member
 Park Jung-bum as Jung-bum, a North Korean defector 
 Yoon Jong-bin as Jong-bin, an epileptic man
 Lee Joo-young as Joo-young
 Lee Joon-dong as Ye-ri's father
 Choi Si-hyung as Boy

Special appearance 
 Shin Min-a as Min-ah 
 Yoo Yeon-seok as Motorcycle man
 Kim Eui-sung as President
 Kim Tae-hoon as Tae-hoon
 Jo Dal-hwan as Thug 1
 Kang San-ae as Fortune Teller

References

External links
 
 
 

2016 films
2010s Korean-language films
2016 drama films
South Korean drama films
Films directed by Zhang Lu
2010s South Korean films